RSCN may refer to:

Registered Sick Children's Nurse, a medical title given to a United Kingdom nurse specialised in the care of children
Registered State Change Notification, an FC network switch function